King King is the debut album by the blues-rock band the Red Devils.  It was recorded live at King King Club in Los Angeles during three or four of their regular Monday-night performances in 1991.

The album captures the immediacy and informality of a small club performance.  It features the band's interpretation of blues songs originally recorded by Little Walter, Sonny Boy Williamson II, Howlin' Wolf, and Willie Dixon as well as some band originals.

Critical reception

King King was released in July 1992 and a review in USA Today called it "the year's most electrifying live album, a stunning debut".  According to the Los Angeles Times, "King King is a 12-song live recording that captures the band in fine, aggressive form at the La Brea Avenue club".

AllMusic's gave the album a three out of five star rating, calling it a mix of straight-ahead blues and singer/harmonica player Lester Butler's later alternative rock.

Track listing

Personnel
The Red Devils
Lester Butler – vocals, harmonica
Paul "The Kid" Size – lead guitar
Dave Lee Bartel – rhythm guitar
Johnny Ray Bartel – bass
Bill Bateman – drums

References

External links
 No Fightin': The Red Devils, Lester Butler and California blues, rock and roots music

1992 debut albums
Albums produced by Rick Rubin
1992 live albums
Live blues rock albums